Sirik County is in Hormozgan province, Iran. The capital of the county is the city of Sirik. At the 2006 census, the region's population (as Byaban District of Minab County) was 38,251 in 6,623 households. The following census in 2011 counted 43,185 people in 9,294 households, by which time the district had been separated from the county to form Sirik County. At the 2016 census, the county's population was 45,723 in 11,304 households.

Administrative divisions

The population history and structural changes of Sirik County's administrative divisions over three consecutive censuses are shown in the following table. The latest census shows two districts, four rural districts, and three cities.

References

 

Counties of Hormozgan Province